Florentine Pauline Frederique Steenberghe (born 11 November 1967 in Utrecht) is a former Dutch field hockey midfielder, who played 113 international matches for the Dutch national team, in which she scored six goals.

A player from HGC in the 1990s, she competed at the 1992 and the 1996 Summer Olympics, winning bronze in Atlanta, Georgia.

External links
 
 Dutch Hockey Federation

1967 births
Living people
Dutch female field hockey players
Olympic field hockey players of the Netherlands
Field hockey players at the 1992 Summer Olympics
Field hockey players at the 1996 Summer Olympics
Olympic bronze medalists for the Netherlands
Sportspeople from Utrecht (city)
Olympic medalists in field hockey
Medalists at the 1996 Summer Olympics
HGC players
20th-century Dutch women
21st-century Dutch women